Olton Reservoir or Olton Mere is a canal feeder reservoir in the Olton district of Solihull, West Midlands, England.

The reservoir, constructed in 1799 to supply the Grand Union Canal, was formed from marshland fed by Folly Brook. It was designed to hold 150 locks full of water, but this was not achieved until it was extended in 1834. It is the largest of the few areas of open water in Solihull and supports numerous waterfowl.

The lake and its surroundings are privately owned by the Canal and River Trust and are leased to Olton Mere Sailing Club. The sailing club is run by a board of trustees.

See also

Canals of the United Kingdom
History of the British canal system

References

Canal reservoirs in England
Reservoirs in the West Midlands (county)